Thrumster was a railway station located at Thrumster, Highland, Scotland between Wick and Lybster. The station building can still be seen alongside the main road in Thrumster.

History 
Latitude: 58° 23' 23.82" N Longitude: -3° 08' 10.75" W

The station was opened as part of the Wick and Lybster Railway on 1 July 1903. It was one of the five stations along the line. The Railway was shown in Schedule one of the RailwayAct 1921 as being part of part of The North Western, Midland, and West Scottish Group. 

As with the other stations on the line, the station was closed from 3 April 1944. It began to be used as a post office 

In 2011 Yarrows Heritage Trust restored the railway.

References

Notes

Sources 
 
 
 

Disused railway stations in Caithness
Railway stations in Great Britain opened in 1903
Railway stations in Great Britain closed in 1944
William Roberts railway stations